Library of Congress is a 1945 American short documentary film about the Library of Congress, directed by Alexander Hammid, and produced by the Office of War Information. It was nominated for an Academy Award for Best Documentary Short.

Library of Congress was restored from a 35mm nitrate print by the Academy Film Archive in 2006. The film is part of the Academy War Film Collection, one of the largest collections of World War II-era short films held outside government archives.

References

External links
 
 
 
 
 Library of Congress at the National Archives and Records Administration

1945 films
1945 documentary films
1945 short films
1940s short documentary films
American short documentary films
American World War II propaganda films
American black-and-white films
Black-and-white documentary films
Films directed by Alexandr Hackenschmied
Library of Congress
1940s English-language films